Christ Church Methodist Church is a Grade II listed English church in Long Eaton, Derbyshire.

History
The church was built between 1903 and 1904 to designs by the Nottingham-based architects, Arthur Brewill and Basil Baily, in the Art Nouveau Gothic style. 

The foundation stone was laid on 25 June 1903 

The adjoining Sunday School was built in 1886. During the construction of the church, Harry Wass, a stonemason, was struck by lightning and killed.

Organ
The church has a pipe organ dating from 1904 by Andrews, which was restored by Henry Willis around 1965. This was rebuilt in 1983 by M. C. Thompson. A specification of the organ can be found on the National Pipe Organ Register.

See also
Listed buildings in Long Eaton

References

Long Eaton
Churches completed in 1903
Gothic Revival church buildings in England
Gothic Revival architecture in Derbyshire
Methodist churches in Derbyshire
Art Nouveau architecture in England
Art Nouveau church buildings in the United Kingdom
Basil Baily